Vicki Schneider (born August 12, 1957) is a former Republican member of the Missouri House of Representatives. Schneider represented the 17th District which encompasses portions of St. Charles County, Missouri. She was first elected to the Missouri House in 2002. Schneider served four terms in the Missouri House of Representatives, the most allowed by term limits.

Early life, education and career
Vicki Schneider was born in St. Louis, Missouri, graduating from Fort Zumwalt High School in O'Fallon in 1976.  Following high school Schneider then attended St. Mary's College in O'Fallon. When not attending to legislative duties she is the president of Schneider Construction Company, and Schneider Properties—businesses co-founded with her husband. Schneider and husband Michael are the parents of two children, a son and a daughter, and one grandson.

Civic activities
Representative Schneider is a member of the Custom Builders Guild, Home Builders Association, St. Charles Board of Realtors, 1904 World Fair Charitable Foundation, Committee for Parkinson's Disease, and O'Fallon Community Foundation. She is on the Board of Directors for the Boys & Girls Clubs of St. Charles. Schneider was named Leukemia Society Woman of the Year in 1996 and 1998.

Politics
Vicki Schneider was first elected to the Missouri House of Representatives in 2002, winning reelection in 2004 and 2006. Schneider lost a close reelection race to Democrat Kenny Biermann in November, 2008. She made an abortive run for O'Fallon mayor in 2009 but ended her campaign in under two weeks. Schneider defeated Biermann in a rematch election in November 2010. She could not run again for the Missouri House in 2012 due to term limits. Among her most notable legislative achievements is sponsoring the bill which created Missouri's AMBER Alert system.

Electoral history

State Representative

State Senate

References

Official Manual, State of Missouri, 2005-2006. Jefferson City, MO: Secretary of State.

1957 births
Living people
Politicians from St. Louis
People from O'Fallon, Missouri
Republican Party members of the Missouri House of Representatives
American real estate businesspeople
Women state legislators in Missouri
American women in business
21st-century American women